Softtek is a Mexico-based information technology company, operating in North America, Latin America, Europe and Asia. Headquartered in Monterrey, Mexico, the company has 15,000 associates in Mexico and abroad and is the largest private IT vendor in Latin America.  The company offers application software development, testing, security and support; business process outsourcing (BPO); and IT infrastructure management, security and support to more than 400 corporations in more than 20 countries. It also acts as a value added reseller (VAR) for SAP, Microsoft, Blue Yonder, AWS and other software products. The company has trademarked the term "nearshoring" to describe the provision of outsourced services to customers in other countries that are in proximity.

History

Softtek was founded in 1982 as a small IT services company by Gerardo López, develop customized software for customers including Mexico’s second largest bank and managing their IT infrastructure. Following the passage of the North American Free Trade Agreement (NAFTA) in 1994, in 1997 Softtek introduced the nearshore model, opening the first global delivery center in Latin America. In August 2000, Blanca Treviño took the position of President and CEO. In August 2007, the company acquired China based I.T. UNITED, extending its services to the Asian market. In December 2019, Softtek acquired 75% of Vector ITC, Spain-based digital technology services firm.

Management

Softtek has one of the few female CEOs in a large multinational company. Blanca Treviño, President & CEO of Softtek, assumed the position in August 2000. Under her leadership Softtek became the largest private IT service provider in Latin America. She is a board member for Wal-Mart Mexico, The United States – Mexico Foundation for Science, the University of Monterrey, and TecMilenio University. She is also an adviser to the Government of Nuevo León, her home state in Mexico. She was featured as a “Rising Star” in 2007 by Fortune Magazine’s "50 most powerful women in global business" issue. Treviño was also selected as the fourth most powerful business woman in Mexico by CNN Expansión in 2008, which was her second time featured in this ranking. In 2019, WITI inducted Blanca into the Women in Technology Hall of Fame.

Controversy 
On May 31, 2020, in the midst of the commotion by the worldwide Black Lives Matter movement, the Brazilian affiliate was involved in accusations of racism on social networks after firing an employee who led the movement in Brazil. In response, Softtek said: "our human resources policies comply with regulations and are in line with our code of ethics"

Acquisitions

References

External links
 Softtek website

Technology companies established in 1982
Information technology companies of Mexico
Privately held companies of Mexico
Companies based in Monterrey
Mexican brands
Mexican companies established in 1982